The Kansas City Comets were a professional indoor soccer team based for most of its existence in Kansas City, Missouri. They played in the original Major Indoor Soccer League (MISL; later the Major Soccer League) from 1979–1991, when they folded. They played their home games in Kemper Arena.

The team originated as the Detroit Lightning, which joined the MISL as an expansion team in the 1979–1980 season. After a year in Detroit the team relocated to San Francisco, California, becoming the San Francisco Fog. They moved to Kansas City in 1981, where they remained for ten years. In Kansas City the team went to the league playoffs seven times, advancing to the division finals three times.

History
In 1979 the Major Indoor Soccer League placed an expansion franchise in Detroit, Michigan. The team, then known as the Detroit Lightning, failed to make the playoffs, and at the end of the season were purchased by entrepreneur David Schoenstadt, later the founder of Discovery Zone. Schoenstadt relocated the team to San Francisco, California, where they were renamed the San Francisco Fog. They again failed to make the playoffs in the 1980–1981 season, and Schoenstadt moved the team once more, this time to Kansas City, Missouri, rebranding them the Kansas City Comets.

The Comets failed to qualify for the playoffs in the 1981–1982 season, but were thereafter consistent playoff contenders, making a total of seven playoff appearances in ten seasons. They advanced to the quarterfinals in 1985, the division semifinals in 1987, and the division finals in 1988, 1990, and 1991. They had enjoyed a strong attendance in their early years, but ticket sales declined later in their run, dropping from an average high of 15,786 in the 1983–1984 season to a low of 7,103 in the 1990–1991 season. Though they finished second in the league in their last two seasons of operations, the Comets could not withstand the drop in revenue, and folded at the end of the 1990–1991 season.

The Comets were followed the next season by the Kansas City Attack of the National Professional Soccer League; this team was known as the "Kansas City Comets" from 2001–2005. In 2010 the Missouri Comets, based in nearby Independence, joined the new Major Indoor Soccer League, carrying on the legacy of the original Comets.

Stars and fan favorites included Enzo Di Pede, Billy Gazonas, Gino Schiraldi, Greg Makowski, Victor Petroni, Jan Goossens, Damir Haramina, Kia, Dale Mitchell, Alan Mayer, Zoran Savic, Jim Schwab, Gordon Hill, Tasso Koutsoukos, Manny Schwartz, David Doyle, Barry Wallace, Tim Clark, Elson Seale, Yilmaz Orhan, and Ty Keough as well as coaches Pat McBride and Rick Benben.

Ownership
 Dr. David Schoenstadt (1979–87)
 Kansas City Comets, Inc. (1987–91)

Staff
 Dick Berg General manager
 Peter Simon Public Relations Director
 Brad Jacobs Marketing Director
 Tim Leiweke – General Manager (1981–84) President (1986–88)

Coaching staff

Head coaches
  Terry Fisher (1979–80)
   Johnny Moore (1980–81)
  Luis Dabo (1981) 2 Wins 7 Losses
  Pat McBride (1981–84) 63 Wins 80 Losses (Postseason: 2 Wins 5 Losses/No Series Wins, 2 Series Losses)
  Rick Benben (1984–87)  47 Wins 57 Losses (Postseason: 2 Wins 3 Losses/1  Series Win, 1 Series Loss)
  Niki Nikolic (1987-Interim) 1 Win 3 Losses
  Dave Clements (1987–91) 124 Wins 111 Losses (Postseason: 18 wins 16 Losses/3 Series Wins, 4 Series Losses)

Assistants
 Johnny Moore (1981)
 Tony Simoes (1981–82)
 Rick Benben (1982–84)
 Billy Gazonas (1984–86)
 Niki Nikolic (1986–87)
 Tony Glavin (1988–89)

Year-by-year

Detroit Lightning

San Francisco Fog

Kansas City Comets

Honors
Rookie of the Year
 1986: Dave Boncek
 1988: David Doyle

Coach of the Year
 1983: Pat McBride

Players

San Francisco Fog Roster

Kansas City Comets
 Marco Antonio Abascal (1981–82) 7 Apps  1 Goal  0 Assists
 Laurie Abrahams (1985–86) 55 Apps  38 Goals  35 Assists
 Tom Alioto (1982–84) 26 Apps  1 Goal  6 Assists
 Gary Amlong (1981–83) 68 Apps  9 Goals  15 Assists
 Ed Anibal (1989–90) 38 Apps  0 Goals  0 Assists
 Chad Ashton (1990–91) 44 Apps  9 Goals  11 Assists
 John Bain (1986–87) 43 Apps  26 Goals  27 Assists
 Mike Bakic (1981–82) 20 Apps  10 Goals  4 Assists
  Boris Bandov (1983–85) 34 Apps  1 Goal  6 Assists
  Nebo Bandovic (1989–90) 5 Apps  0 Goals  0 Assists
 Petar Baralic (1984–85) 17 Apps  5 Goals  6 Assists
 Porfirio Armando Betancourt (1987–88) 48 Apps  5 Goals  8 Assists
 David Boncek (1985–90) 230 Apps  36 Goals  21 Assists
 Barney Boyce (1981–82) 3 Apps  0 Goals  0 Assists
 Bob Bozada (1982–83) 22 Apps  1 Goal  1 Assist
 David Brcic (1989) GK-16 Apps  8 wins  8 losses
 Cliff Brown (1983–84) GK-4 Apps  1 Win  2 Losses
 Jens Busk (1986–87) 13 Apps  1 Goal  4 Assists
 David Butler (1981–82) 15 Apps  8 Goals  5 Assists
 Cacho (1986–88) 40 Apps  10 Goals  8 Assists
 Charlie Carey (1982–83; 1984–85) 92 Apps  36 Goals  19 Assists
 Gerald "Magic" Celestin (1981–82) 12 Apps  2 Goals  1 Assist
 John Cerin (1985) 3 Apps  1 Goal  0 Assists
 Engin Cinar (1981–82) 1 App  0 Goals  0 Assists
 Tim Clark (1982–87) 191 Apps  20 Goals  38 Assists
 Gary Collier (1987) 25 Apps  0 Goals  1 Assist
 Graziano Cornolo (1983–84) 26 Apps  5 Goals  3 Assists
 Stan Cummins (1988–89) 48 Apps  6 Goals  15 Assists
 Val DeSouza (1981–82) 48 Apps  12 Goals  8 Assists
  Angelo DiBernardo (1985–86) 48 Apps  22 Goals  17 Assists
 Zoran Dimitrijević (1986) 8 Apps  0 Goals  0 Assists
 Enzo Di Pede (1981–86) GK-114 Apps  39 Wins  65 Losses
 John Dolinsky (1981–82) 20 Apps  4 Goals  5 Assists
 Mike Dowler (1989–91) GK 57 Apps  29 Wins  26 Losses
 David Doyle (1987–91) 132 Apps  79 Goals  38 Assists
 Chris Duke (1989–91) 71 Apps  2 Goals  2 Assists
 Ted Eck (1988–91) 100 Apps  38 Goals  26 Assists
 Jorge Espinoza (1986–87)  47 Apps  7 Goals  3 Assists
 Charlie Fajkus (1984–87) 120 Apps  57 Goals  49 Assists
 Ivair Ferreira (1981–82) 14 Apps  5 Goals  3 Assists
 Miguel Filardo (1981–82) 7 Apps  2 Goals  0 Assists
 Joe Filla (1981–83) 40 Apps  3 Goals  6 Assists
  Iain Fraser (1986–91) 206 Apps  19 Goals  31 Assists
 Mark Frederickson (1981–85) 153 Apps  38 Goals  33 Assists
 Keith Fulk (1985–86) 13 Apps  0 Goals  2 Assists
 Keith Furphy (1985–86) 29 Apps  22 Goals  17 Assists
 Scott Gaither (1990–91) 1 App  0 Goals  0 Assists
 Pedro Gano (1981–82) 7 Apps  0 Goals  0 Assists
 Billy Gazonas (1982–84) 55 Apps  9 Goals  13 Assists
 George Gibbs (1981–82) 7 Apps  0 Goals  2 Assists
 Ed Gettemeier (1986–89) GK-51 Apps  21 Wins  31 Losses
 Tony Glavin (1988–89; 1990–91) 29 Apps  4 Goals  4 Assists
 Jan Goossens (1986–91) 227 Apps  221 Goals  237 Assists
 Jim Gorsek (1989–91) GK-48 Apps  27 Wins  19 Losses
 Gerry Gray (1989–90) 12 Apps  3 Goals  6 Assists
 Warren Green (1981–82) 1 App  0 Goals  0 Assists
 Charley Greene (1986–88) 93 Apps  21 Goals  20 Assists
 Clive Griffiths (1981–85) 112 Apps  2 Goals  20 Assists
 Albert Guðmundsson (1982–83) 11 Apps  1 Goal  1 Assist
 Winston Hackett (1981–82) 8 Apps  2 Goals  2 Assists
 Kevin Handlan (1981–85) 129 Apps  15 Goals  17 Assists
  Damir Haramina (1985–89) 143 Apps  111 Goals  65 Assists
 John Hayes (1983–84) 41 Apps  12 Goals  12 Assists
 Gordon Hill (1983–84) 49 Apps  50 Goals  28 Assists
 Austin Hudson (1981–82) 2 Apps  0 Goals  0 Assists
 Chris Hundelt (1987–88) 20 Apps  3 Goals  4 Assists
 Kevin Hundelt (1988–91) 143 Apps  43 Goals  30 Assists
 Greg Ion (1988–90) 99 Apps 48 Goals 33 Assists
 Emilio John (1981–82) 7 Apps  2 Goals  0 Assists
 Michel Kaham (1986) 7 Apps  0 Goals  1 Assist
 Tom Kain (1986–91) 129 Apps  12 Goals  14 Assists
 Chris Kenny (1988–89) 46 Apps  4 Goals  5 Assists
 Ty Keough (1985–86) 41 Apps  2 Goals  1 Assist
 John Klein (1990–91) 34 Apps  4 Goals  10 Assists
 Tasso Koutsoukos (1983–86, 1987–88) 180 Apps  98 Goals  84 Assists
 Jeff Kraft (1987) 1 App  1 Goal  1 Assist
 Art Kramer (1981–82) 15 Apps  7 Goals  4 Assists
 Jorgen Kristensen (1986–87) 17 Apps  5 Goals  10 Assists
 Stuart Lee (1982–83; 1985–86) 82 Apps  39 Goals  27 Assists
  Mark Liveric (1984–85) 9 Apps  3 Goals  5 Assists
 Duncan MacEwan (1986–87) 25 Apps  3 Goals  1 Assist
 Greg Makowski (1982–85) 136 Apps  65 Goals  83 Assists
 Nick Mangione (19841-85) 28 Apps  9 Goals  4 Assists
 Patricio Margetic (1986–87) 69 Apps  36 Goals  48 Assists
 Mark Mathews (1990–91) 14 Apps  1 Goal  0 Assists
 Arnie Mausser (1985) GK-1 App  1 Win  0 Losses
 Alan Mayer (1985–89) GK-116 Apps  56 Wins  55 Losses
 Billy McKeon (1982–84) 20 Apps  0 Goals  0 Assists
 Doug McLagan (1989–91) 67 Apps  12 Goals  10 Assists
 Keith Meyer (1986) 15 Apps  0 Goals  0 Assists
 Dale Mitchell (1985–90) 248 Apps  212 Goals  147 Assists
 Johnny Moore (1981) 1 Apps  1 Goal  0 Assists
 Louie Nanchoff (1987) 27 Apps  14 Goals  16 Assists
 Doug Neely (1989–91) 95 Apps  18 Goals  21 Assists
 Johan Neeskens (1985–86) 27 Apps  1 Goal  2 Assists
 Niki Nikolic (1984) 6 Apps  0 Goals  0 Assists
 Pat Occhiuto (1981–82) 15 Apps  0 Goals  1 Assist
 Damian Ogunsuyi (1981–82) 10 Apps  5 Goals  4 Assists
 Mike O'Mara (1981) 9 Apps  0 Goals  0 Assists
 Yilmaz Orhan (1981–83; 1986) 76 Apps  63 Goals  40 Assists
 Steve Pecher (1984–85) 54 Apps  6 Goals  16 Assists
 Paul Peschisolido (1990–91) 43 Apps  24 Goals  11 Assists
 Victor Petroni (1981–83) GK-44 Apps  21 Wins  18 Losses
 Iubo Petrovic (1981–82) 25 Apps  15 Goals  18 Assists
 Ben Popoola (1981–82) 25 Apps  11 Goals  7 Assists
 Frank Rasmussen (1987–88) 21 Apps  1 Goal  5 Assists
 Claudio Rocha (1981–82) 9 Apps  3 Goals  2 Assists
 Kim Roentved (1987–91) 158 Apps  57 Goals  82 Assists
 Emilio Romero (1981–82) 17 Apps  5 Goals  5 Assists
 Owen Rose (1981–82) 11 Apps  0 Goals  1 Assist
 Edmond Rugova (1986–87) 14 Apps  1 Goal  1 Assist
 Carlos Salguero (1981–82; 1984–86) 86 Apps  38 Goals  30 Assists (Deceased)
 Len Salvemini (1981–82) 42 Apps  6 Goals  15 Assists
 Dave Sarachan (1981–82) 11 Apps  3 Goals  0 Assists
 Zoran Savic (1981–84) 110 Apps  70 Goals  44 Assists
 Gino Schiraldi (1981–91) 389 Apps  75 Goals  82 Assists
 Larry Schmidgall (1981–82) 16 Apps  3 Goals  1 Assist
 Ray Schnettgoecke (1981–82) 5 Apps  0 Goals  0 Assists
 Jim Schwab (1985–88; 1990–91) 116 Apps  15 Goals  20 Assists
 Manny Schwartz (1983–86) GK-54 Apps  24 Wins  31 Losses
 Elson Seale (1982–85) 117 Apps  56 Goals  40 Assists
 Silvio (1981–82) 3 Apps  0 Goals  2 Assists
 Tony Simoes (1981–82) 3 Apps  0 Goals  0 Assists
 Rick Snyder (1990–91) 15 Apps  0 Goals  1 Assist
 Craig Stahl (1981–84) 36 Apps  10 Goals  5 Assists
 Shane Steadman (1988–89) 3 Apps  1 Goal  0 Assists
 John Stremlau (1983–84) 39 Apps  9 Goals  9 Assists
 Benny Tabak (1984–85) 44 Apps  18 Goals  16 Assists
 Jim Tietjens (1983–84) GK-7 Apps  2 Wins  4 Losses
 Larry Tukis (1988) GK-1 App  0 Wins  1 Loss
 Tim Twellman (1983–86) 88 Apps  11 Goals  26 Assists
 Tim Tyma (1981–82) 4 Apps  0 Goals  0 Assists
  Carl Valentine (1990–91) 48 Apps  27 Goals  26 Assists
 Greg Villa (1982–83) 51 Apps  26 Goals  17 Assists
 Barry Wallace (1987–90) 107 Apps  50 Goals  39 Assists (Deceased)
 Tonnie Wareman (1987–88) 23 Apps  5 Goals  5 Assists
 Martin Zimmerman (1986) 1 App  0 Goals  0 Assists
 Mickey Zivaljevic (1983–84) 1 App  0 Goals  0 Assists
 Kia Zolgharnain (1987–90) 104 Apps  66 Goals  37 Assists

External links

San Francisco Fog
 San Francisco Fog Roster
 The Year in American Soccer – 1981
 Fog logo

Kansas City Comets
 Kansas City Comets
 MISL history

Defunct indoor soccer clubs in the United States
Major Indoor Soccer League (1978–1992) teams
C
Soccer clubs in Missouri
Association football clubs established in 1979
Association football clubs disestablished in 1991
Sports in the Kansas City metropolitan area
1979 establishments in Missouri
1991 disestablishments in Missouri